J.W.R. Moore House, also known as the J.W. Miller House and J.C. Biller House, is a historic home located at Mount Jackson, Shenandoah County, Virginia. It was built in 1871, and is a two-story, three bay, "L"-shaped brick dwelling in the Italianate style.   It features elaborate wood trim and a large, square belvedere with a tall finial.  Also on the property are the contributing brick combination icehouse / smokehouse / summer kitchen (c. 1871) and a frame tenant house.
It was listed on the National Register of Historic Places in 2005.

References

Houses on the National Register of Historic Places in Virginia
Italianate architecture in Virginia
Houses completed in 1871
Houses in Shenandoah County, Virginia
Mount Jackson, Virginia
National Register of Historic Places in Shenandoah County, Virginia